Tiago Henrique Da Silva Pereira, (born 30 April 1994) is a Brazilian football player.

Club statistics

References

External links

1994 births
Living people
Brazilian footballers
Brazilian expatriate footballers
Expatriate footballers in Japan
J1 League players
J2 League players
Nagoya Grampus players
FC Gifu players
Association football forwards
Footballers from São Paulo (state)